This is a list of films produced by the Ollywood film industry based in Bhubaneshwar and Cuttack in 1993:

A-Z

References

1993
Ollywood
 Ollywood
1990s in Orissa
1993 in Indian cinema